Fight for Love is the fourth album by the Canadian band 54-40, released in 1989. The band supported the album with a Canadian tour.

Production
The album was coproduced by Dave Ogilvie and frontman Neil Osborne. The band used a mellotron that had belonged to King Crimson, loaned to them by Bob Rock. Some of the songs were inspired by Osborne's wife's drawings of Don Quixote.

Critical reception

The Calgary Herald deemed the album "a blend of guitar-driven rock numbers and lofty lyrics." The Globe and Mail wrote that "Osborne and co-producer David Ogilvie focus attention on the hopeful, even naive humanism of the songs and on the subtle but powerful interplay." The Windsor Star noted the "guitar-driven sound derived from late-1960s folk-rock." The Washington Post labeled the album "Vancouver's entry in the R.E.M. sweepstakes," writing: "Sweetly melodic and—it almost goes without saying—jangly, Fight for Love also has some guts."

Track listing
All songs written by 54-40 except where noted.
 "Here in My House"  – 3:49
 "Kissfolk"  – 3:33
 "Over My Head"  – 3:25
 "Miss You"  – 4:34 (Neil Osborne, Phil Comparelli)
 "Baby Have Some Faith"  – 5:51 (Osborne, Comparelli)
 "Fight for Love"  – 2:55 (Osborne)
 "Laughing"  – 3:51 (Osborne)
 "Walk Talk Madly"  – 4:42
 "Where Is My Heart"  – 3:25
 "Journey"  – 7:44 (Osborne)

Personnel
Neil Osborne: Vocals, Rhythm Guitar
Phil Comparelli: Lead and Lap Steel Guitars, Trumpet, Vocals
Brad Merritt: Bass
Matt Johnson: Drums, Percussion

Production
Arranged by 54-40
Executive Producer: Kevin Laffey
Produced by Dave Ogilvie and Neil Osborne
Recorded by Greg Reely
Mixed by James "Jimbo" Barton (tracks 1-3 and 5) and Greg Reely (all others)
Mastered by Stephen Marcussen
All songs published by Fifty Four Forty Music.

References

54-40 albums
1989 albums